Maixner is a surname. Notable people with the surname include:

Franjo Maixner (1841–1903), Croatian academic
Štefan Maixner (born 1968), Slovak footballer
Wirginia Maixner (born 1963), Australian neurosurgeon

See also
Meixner

German-language surnames